Olivia's Greatest Hits Vol. 2 is the second greatest hits album by Olivia Newton-John released on 3 September 1982. The album compiled most singles released by Newton-John since the release of her 1977 Olivia Newton-John's Greatest Hits album from her following albums and soundtracks. The album included two new recordings; "Heart Attack" and "Tied Up", both of which were actually recorded during the sessions for the "Physical" album. It was released in the United Kingdom as Olivia's Greatest Hits.

The album is one of the best selling album by Olivia and was certified multi-platinum in both United States and Canada.

Production and release
The album is Olivia's second greatest hits album and include songs released by the singer between 1978 and 1982, her previous compilation include songs from 1971 to 1976. Five of the ten songs of the album are from two successful movies by the singer: Grease (1978) and Xanadu (1980). The album omitted some singles released by Newton-John during this period (1978-1982) including songs from Grease ("Summer Nights"), Totally Hot ("Deeper Than the Night", "Totally Hot", "Dancin' 'Round and 'Round") and Physical ("Landslide"). The album also did not include "I Can't Help It", her duet with Andy Gibb from his After Dark album, even though the song reached #12 in the Billboard Billboard Hot 100 chart.

The album was released in the United Kingdom as Olivia's Greatest Hits with a slightly different cover and a 19-track listing covering all of her major UK hits from If Not for You. In Australia it was released as Greatest Hits Vol. 3.

The two new songs ("Heart Attack" and "Tied Up") were released as singles to promote the album and reached number 3 and 38 on the U.S. pop charts, respectively. "Heart Attack" was a Number One single in France, and it was certified gold in Canada. "Tied Up" was a surprise Number One single in Cyprus.

Reception

The album was well received by the music critics. JT Griffith from AllMusic website gave the album four out of five stars and wrote the album "remains the best choice for casual fans who only want the roller-rink hits".

The album only climbed to No. 16 on the Billboard 200, but spent over 80 weeks on the chart and ultimately ranked as the No. 10 album of 1983. This was the longest charting album of Newton-John's career and her first non-soundtrack album to rank in the year-end Top 10. It also peaked at number 8 with a 38-week chart run in UK. 150,000 were shipped in Canada initially.

The album was certified double Platinum by the RIAA in the US and Platinum in the UK.

Track listing

1982 International Edition  and 2023 Deluxe Edition re-release

"Heart Attack"
"Magic"
"Physical"
"Deeper Than The Night"
"Hopelessly Devoted To You"
"Make A Move On Me"
"Landslide"
"A Little More Love"
"You're The One That I Want"
"Tied Up"
"Suddenly"
"Totally Hot"
"The Promise"
"Xanadu"

Charts

Weekly charts

Year-end charts

Certifications and sales

References

Sources

External links
 
 
 

1982 greatest hits albums
Albums produced by John Farrar
Olivia Newton-John compilation albums